Ibazocine (INN, USAN) is an opioid analgesic which was never marketed.

See also 
 Benzomorphan

References 

Analgesics
Benzomorphans
Opioids